The 2019–20 Club Tijuana season is the 13th season in the football club's history and the 8th consecutive season in the top flight of Mexican football. The club this season will compete in the Apertura and Clausura tournaments as well as in the Copa MX and Leagues Cup.

Coaching staff

Players

Squad information

Players and squad numbers last updated on 23 July 2019.Note: Flags indicate national team as has been defined under FIFA eligibility rules. Players may hold more than one non-FIFA nationality.

Transfers

In

Out

Competitions

Overview

Torneo Apertura

League table

Results summary

Result round by round

Matches

Leagues Cup

Copa MX

Group stage

Statistics

Squad statistics

Goals

Clean sheets

Own goals

Disciplinary record

References

External links

Mexican football clubs 2019–20 season